"Down Time" is the debut solo single by New Zealand R&B singer, Aaradhna. It entered the New Zealand Singles Chart at number 4 on 23 January 2006, and peaked at number 3.

Track listing
"Down Time" (RADIO Edit)
"Down Time" (Instrumental)
"Down Time" (A Cappella)

Charts

References 

2006 singles
Aaradhna songs